The 2012 National Premier Soccer League season is the 10th season of the NPSL.

Format

Summary of Regions and Conferences

Changes From 2011

Name Changes/Rebrands 
The Santa Ana Winds' NPSL side is now affiliated with the Fullerton Rangers. The Lancaster Rattlers have moved to become FC Santa Clarita.

New Franchises 
13 franchises were announced as joining the league this year:

Folding 
Chicago Fire NPSL 
Hollywood United Hitmen 
Minnesota Kings 
New Jersey Blaze

On Hiatus 
FC Reading Revolution

Standings
As of 7/22/12
Purple indicates division title clinched
Green indicates playoff berth clinched

Northeast Division – Atlantic Conference

Northeast Division – Keystone Conference

South-Southeast Conference-East

South-Southeast Conference-West

South-South Central Conference

South-South Central Conference (Additional teams)

Midwest-Central Conference

Midwest-Great Lakes Conference

West Division – Northern Conference

West Division – Southern Conference

Source:

Playoffs

Format
NORTHEAST
The top two finishers in the Keystone and Atlantic Conference play in a crossover playoff.
 
WEST
The top two finishers in the North and South place in a crossover playoff. 
  
MIDWEST-CENTRAL
No playoff. Champion qualifies for National Tournament.
 
MIDWEST-GREAT LAKES
Top four teams are playing in a playoff tournament.
 
SOUTHEAST
East and West Division winners play each other for Championship.

Northeast Division Playoffs

West Division Playoffs

Midwest-Great Lakes Playoffs

South-Southeast Final

Midwest Final

NPSL Championship

Semi-finals

Third Place Playoff

NPSL Championship Game

Notes

References

2012
4